Miguel Esteban Peñaloza Barrientos (born 1959) is a Colombian electrical engineer, who briefly served in 2012 as the 11th Minister of Transport of Colombia. He has also served as High Presidential Adviser for the Regions and Citizen Participation in the administration of President Juan Manuel Santos Calderón between 2010 and 2012, and as High Presidential Adviser for Competitiveness and the Regions since 2008. during the administration of President Álvaro Uribe Vélez.

On 25 May 2012, President Santos designated Peñaloza to succeed Germán Cardona Gutiérrez as Minister of Transport of Colombia; he was sworn in on 28 May by President Santos in a ceremony at the Palace of Nariño.

References

Further reading
 

1959 births
Living people
People from Cúcuta
Industrial University of Santander alumni
Colombian electrical engineers
Presidential advisers of Colombia
Ministers of Transport of Colombia